Gracie is originally a Scottish surname, an anglicisation of the Scottish Gaelic word greusaich (or griasaich), originally meaning an embroiderer and later a shoemaker. It is also a feminine given name, usually a diminutive form of Grace.

People

Surname
 Charlie Gracie (1936-2022), American guitarist and singer
 Gracie family of New York City:
 Archibald Gracie (1755–1829), Scottish-born shipping magnate and early American businessman
 Archibald Gracie III (1832–1864), United States Army officer and Confederate brigadier general
 Archibald Gracie IV (1859–1912), American writer and survivor of the sinking of the RMS Titanic
 Gracie family in Canada:
John Gracie (born 1984), Canadian Internet/media personality known as Fade Dragontear
 Gracie family, lineage of Brazilian jiu-jitsu champions, many of whom have also found success in mixed martial arts competition:
Carlos Gracie (1902–1994), co-founder of the martial art of Brazilian jiu-jitsu
Carlos Gracie Jr. (born 1956) or "Carlinhos", founder of the Gracie Barra Academy in Rio de Janeiro, Brazil
Carlson Gracie Sr. (1932–2006), eldest son of Carlos Gracie
Hélio Gracie (1913–2009), co-founder of the martial art of Brazilian jiu-jitsu
Kyra Gracie (born 1985), Brazilian jiu-jitsu black belt and multiple title holder
Neiman Gracie (born 1988), Brazilian mixed martial artist
Ralek Gracie (born 1985), Brazilian jiu-jitsu practitioner and a mixed martial artist
Ralph Gracie, son of Robson Gracie
Relson Gracie or "Campeao". second oldest son of Helio Gracie
Renzo Gracie (born 1967), Mixed martial artist and head instructor of the Renzo Gracie Academy, Manhattan
Rickson Gracie (born 1958), son of Hélio Gracie and two-time Vale Tudo Japan tournament winner
Robson Gracie (born 1935), second son of Carlos Gracie
Roger Gracie (born 1981), 2005 ADCC Submission Wrestling World Champion and 8-time BJJ World Jiu-Jitsu Champion
Rolls Gracie (1951–1982), nephew of Helio Gracie
Rolles Gracie Jr. (born 1978), mixed martial artist
Rorion Gracie (born 1952), founder of the UFC
Royce Gracie (born 1966), UFC 1, 2 & 4 winner plus UFC Hall of Famer
Royler Gracie (born 1965), head of the Gracie Humaitá Jiu Jitsu school in Rio de Janeiro Brazil
Ryan Gracie (1974–2007), Pride Mixed martial artist

Given name
 Gracie Abrams (born 1999), American singer-songwriter
 Gracie Allen (1895–1964), American comedian and wife of George Burns
 Gracie Carvalho (born 1990), Brazilian model
 Gracie Cole (1924–2006), British trumpeter and bandleader
 Gracie Fields (1898–1979), English/Italian singer and comedian
 Gracie Gold (born 1995), American figure skater
 Gracie Pfost (1906–1965), American politician
 Gracie Watson (died 1889), child subject of a sculpture by John Walz

See also
Gracie (disambiguation)

Anglicised Scottish Gaelic-language surnames